Sparkle (formerly GMA Artist Center, also known as Sparkle GMA Artist Center and GMA Talent Management and Development Department) is the talent agency owned by GMA Network Inc. based in Quezon City, Metro Manila, Philippines that was founded in 1995.

History
GMA Artist Center conducted several auditions prior to launching its first batch of talents in 1998.  It also launched the "Metropop Star Search" from 1996 to 1998 where winners automatically became part of GMAAC. It was originally headed by veteran talent manager Wyngard Tracy until 2000.  When Felipe Gozon took over as GMA Network's president and CEO in 2000, the Artist Center was placed under the network's Entertainment Division led by Wilma Galvante.  In 2003, GMAAC hired Ida Henares as their newest head.  Under her leadership, GMAAC launched the reality artista search "Starstruck" which became the main launching pad for most star hopefuls since then. In 2007, GMA Artist Center invoked the exclusivity clause. For 2011, GMA Artist Center's slogan was "Making Stars Shine".
 
In 2013, Henares retired from her position. In 2014, Simoun Ferrer and Gigi Santiago-Lara became the new heads of GMAAC.  During their tenure until present day, GMAAC experienced growth and increased popularity, with most of its artists being given recognition here and abroad. On July 13, 2021, former Star Magic Chairman Emeritus Johnny Manahan signed up as GMAAC consultant. On September 5, 2021, GMAAC organized "Signed for Stardom", a digital multi-platform event where current and new talents were signed up and introduced to the public.

GMAAC provides models for various endorsements, actors and directors for film projects of the Philippine television and film industry, and singers for GMA Music.

On December 31, 2021, during GMA Network's New Year's Eve special, it was announced that the agency had been renamed "Sparkle": the rebranding was stated to be an effort to "reinvigorate" the agency. It also launched its theme song, "Let It Spark", which is sung by Psalms David, XOXO and Thea Astley, on February 8, 2022. Senior Vice President Atty. Annette Gozon-Valdes was appointed as the Head of Sparkle.

See also
Rise Artists Studio
Star Magic

References

External links

1995 establishments in the Philippines
Talent agencies of the Philippines